Discovery Canyon Campus (DCC) is a pre-kindergarten-12 school in Academy School District 20 in Colorado Springs, Colorado, United States. The campus is primarily dedicated to STEM courses. The campus serves the far north of Colorado Springs and is located off of the North Gate of the United States Air Force Academy.

DCC's school colors are purple, silver, and black. The school employs three titular academic symbols: the school uses the slogan 'thunder' (i.e. DCC Thunder), many logos are adorned with a lightning bolt and Thor's Hammer, and the physical mascot which is seen at many sporting events is Thor, maintaining its school-wide recognition despite suggestions that the mascot be changed to Thunder Man (a previous candidate for the position of official mascot).

The campus was opened in the fall of 2005 to 5th and 6th grade students. In the fall of 2006, this was expanded to grades PK-7. In 2007, 8th and 9th were opened, and the first graduating class of DCC walked across the stage four years later in May 2011.

The school offers the IB Primary Years Program, IB Middle Years Program, IB Career-related Program, and IB Diploma Program. DCC became an International Baccalaureate World School in May 2008.

The campus was designed by Antoine Predock.

External links
 

Schools in Colorado Springs, Colorado
Public high schools in Colorado
Public middle schools in Colorado
Public elementary schools in Colorado
High schools in Colorado Springs, Colorado
International Baccalaureate schools in Colorado